Miss Universe Malaysia is an annual national beauty pageant that selects Malaysia's representative to the annual Miss Universe contest. On occasion, when the winner does not qualify (due to age or any other reason), a runner-up is sent.

History 
The competition was first held in 1964 when the pageant's title was known as "Miss Malaysia" until 1969 and "Miss Malaysia Universe" from 1970 until 2009 also "Miss Malaya" in 1962 and 1963. No national competition were held in 1968, 2011 and 2021. The pageant was founded in 1962 by Mr. Jaycee Liu Chang Lan who then became the first national director of the pageant. The first franchisee, who signed the contract with Miss Universe Organization was the Petaling Jaya Rotary Club. The pageant was registered under Beyond Entity Sdn. Bhd. in 2009 and MYEG Services Berhad as the franchise holder.

Malaya was first invited to compete in Miss Universe was in Miss Universe 1953. The first Miss Universe Malaysia pageant was held in Stadium Merdeka, Kuala Lumpur in 1964 and has been organized annually since 1969. More than eight thousands spectators were there to witnessed the first ever Miss Universe Malaysia contest. The contest was then won by Angela Filmer from Selangor where she had the rights to compete in Miss Universe 1964 pageant in Miami, Florida, United States which also makes her the second woman from Malaysia to ever competed in Miss Universe stage after Sarah Al-Habshee Abdullah in 1962. However, at that time, Malaysia had not yet been formed. Malaysia was also once withdrawn in Miss Universe 1963. The Malaysian representative for the 12th edition was Nik Azizah Nik Yahya, from Kelantan, nevertheless she was not able to present during the pageant due to unknown reason.

The pageant was first televised in the 1970s. From 2010 to 2017, the pageant was broadcast on Diva and 8TV. From 2017 to 2019, the pageant was broadcast on hurr.tv, which also then became the official online channel. The current official media partner for Miss Universe Malaysia is The Star, an English-language daily newspaper since 2003 until now.

On 11 May 1995, the Government of Selangor issued a fatwa in prohibiting every Muslim woman in Malaysia from joining and competing in any national pageant that sends the winner to an international pageant such as Miss Universe. The fatwa regarding the banning of Muslim women in participating in beauty pageants was finalized through the government gazette on 8 February 1996. The fatwa has been recently issued in Penang on 11 May 2017.

2010–2019 
In 2010, the Miss Malaysia Universe was revamped by then national director, Andrea Fonseka, a former Miss Malaysia Universe 2004 and the pageant changed its name to Miss Universe Malaysia Organization, and moved its headquarters from Kuala Lumpur to Petaling Jaya, Selangor precisely at the MYEG Services Berhad Malaysia building. On 3 November 2012, Andrea stepped down as national director and the position was given to then Miss Malaysia Universe 2003, Elaine Daly. Elaine held the position for a year before it was given to Carey Ng, a former Miss Universe Malaysia 2013. The first pageant production under Carey Ng's auspices was the 2014 competition. On 3 February 2016, she resigned shortly after the Miss Universe Malaysia 2016 competition due to several controversies and again, was replaced by Elaine Daly who has held the position of national director since the resignation of Carey Ng.

2020–2021 
Ever since the pageant's inception in 1964, the country had only placed once which was in 1970 by Josephine Lena Wong. Miss Universe Malaysia 2020, a Sarawakian lass, Francisca Luhong James was ought to end the 50 years of unplacement for Malaysia in Miss Universe yet the fate was not on her side as she was unable to enter the first cut in Miss Universe 2020. Malaysia currently holds the longest streaks of unplacement in Miss Universe beauty pageant.

In 2021, the Miss Universe Malaysia Organization decided to withdraw from participating in the 70th edition in Eilat, Israel due to travel restrictions associated with the COVID-19 pandemic in the country. Malaysia's withdrawal marks the second time the country did not compete in the competition since 1962.

Miss Universe Malaysia 2022 Controversy 
Due to some controversies that have emerged on social media platforms, the recent win of Miss Universe Malaysia 2022, Lesley Cheam has been called into question by beauty pageant fans across the country. The finale was also held privately with no live telecast has raised doubts among the pageant fans. Fans have also petitioned for Ajunee Kaur, the second-place finisher, to represent Malaysia at Miss Universe 2022. However, the Miss Universe Malaysia organization has yet to post a reply regarding the controversy.

2023–present 
On 8 February 2023, a new Miss Universe Malaysia organization was formed under the same ownership with Miss Universe Indonesia. The license is co-owned by an Indonesian artist, Datin Wira Poppy Capella Swastika, which is also the national director of the pageant under Just Capella Sdn. Bhd. management while the CEO for Miss Universe Malaysia is a Malaysian businessman, Dato' Westin Chew. The press launch of the pageant was held at The St. Regis, Kuala Lumpur on 17 February 2023. Present were the Miss Universe and Miss Universe Malaysia team, Miss Universe 2022, R'Bonney Gabriel, second runner-up and top 5 of Miss Universe 2022, Andreína Martínez and Gabriëla Dos Santos, respectively.

Competition 
The modern pageant is attended by participants from various city from the thirteen states and three federal territories (Kuala Lumpur and Selangor are usually represented by more than one participant), for a total of 18 to 20 participants. In 1962, Malaya debut in the Miss Universe pageant. Since September 1963, Malaysian candidates began to compete as Miss Malaysia.

State competitions 
 
From 1963 until the 80s, each state holds a regional competition to choose their delegate for the Miss Universe Malaysia pageant. The state winners hold the title "Miss (State) Universe" for the year of their reign. The state pageants were discontinued since then. These were the following regional competition that sent their delegate to Miss Universe Malaysia pageant:
Miss Johore Universe
Miss Kedah Universe / Miss Kedah-Perlis Universe
Miss Kelantan Universe
Miss Kuala Lumpur
Miss Malacca

Miss Negri Sembilan Universe
Miss Pahang Universe
Miss Penang Universe 
Miss Perak Universe
Miss Perlis Universe / Miss Kedah-Perlis Universe

Miss Sabah
Miss Sarawak
Miss Selangor Universe
Miss Singapore Universe
Miss Trengganu Universe
The most successful state is Selangor, which has had the most semi-finalists and runner-ups including ten winners. Other successful states include Kuala Lumpur, Perak, Sarawak, Penang, and Sabah. The least successful states are Putrajaya, placing only once in the history of the pageant; Labuan, which has only placed twice; and Negeri Sembilan, which gained its only crown in 2015. The states which has not (yet) win any crown were Labuan and Perlis.

Editions

Requirements 
Since 2023, in order to compete in Miss Universe Malaysia, these are the requirements for participants of the Miss Universe Malaysia election:

Must be born female;
must be between the ages of 18 to 28 years old on the pageant date;
must be at least 165 cm height and above;
must not currently be married or pregnant;
must have never been arrested or convicted of any crime;
must have never modeled for any sexually explicit or pornographic materials, artistic nude is acceptable but must be approved by the organization;
must be in good physical and mental health and have no known current sickness that can be contagious;
must be committed to adhering to all the pageant rules and regulations upon acceptance;
must not be under any commercial contract with any agency at the time of appearing for the audition. The applicant once is shortlisted cannot be a part of any other commercial contract

Winners 
The oldest woman to win Miss Universe Malaysia is Miss Universe Malaysia 2011, Deborah Henry of Kuala Lumpur, at 26 years old. Maznah Ali, of Johor, the first runner-up in Miss Malaysia 1967 and the titleholder of Miss Malaysia 1968 was the first to ever compete in two international pageants on the same year: Miss Universe and Miss International. The tallest Miss Universe Malaysia is Miss Universe Malaysia 2004, Andrea Fonseka, of Penang at 6 feet and 0 inch (183 cm).

The first Malay winner to ever win the title was Nik Azizah Nik Yahya of Kelantan in 1963; the first Eurasian winner was Angela Filmer of Selangor in 1964; the first Hispanic winner was Patricia Augustus of Penang in 1965; the first Chinese winner was Helen Lee of Perak in 1966; the first Siamese winner was Monkam Siprasome of Kedah in 1967; the first Caucasian winner was Yvette Batterman of Selangor in 1971; the first Indian winner was Lucy Narayanasamy of Selangor in 1993; the first Chindian winner was Joannabelle Ng of Sabah in 2009; and the first Indigenous winner was Francisca Luhong James of Sarawak in 2020.

Crowns of Miss Universe Malaysia 
The crown of Miss Universe Malaysia has changed numerously since 1964.

 Elegance Club Crown (2008–2010)
Suhara Jewel Crown (2011–2012) — This crown resembles the Conventry Crown of Miss Universe. Created for Miss Universe Malaysia by the Suhara Jewel Art.
 Rafflesia Crown (2013) — The tiara consists of 229 freshwater pearls, six blue sapphires, diamonds and adorned with white gold and designed in floral motif priced at RM500,000 (US$121 thousand), was designed by its director Winnie Sin. The crown was a reflection of Rafflesia The Pearl Centre's 10th anniversary in the entertainment and jewellery making business.
 Ceres Jewel Crown (2014–2015) —  The crown was made by Ceres Jewel Company and worth at RM27,000. Furnished with 18K white gold ring consisting of 37 pieces totaling to 1.82 carats of white and rare champagne fancy colored diamonds.
 Aquamarine Crown (2016–2018) — This crown drawn was inspiration from the roaring ocean waves, the fascinating shades and colors of the ocean water, these elements embodied a woman with nature's wonder. The crown estimated to be worth US$1.3 million. The whole production process, from the first sketches to the production itself, took about six months.
 Reflection Crown (2019–2022) — Features a 10-carat diamond set in white gold and was conceptualized to represent strength, power, courage, creativity, self-respect and love. The crown was named such as it resonates with the values and beauty reflected in each finalist. The crown valued at RM2.38 million (US$580 thousand)

Recent titleholders 

{| class="wikitable" style="font-size: 92%"
!Year
!State
!Miss Universe Malaysia
!Venue
!Placement at Miss Universe
!Special awards
|-
|2023
| colspan="5" 
|}

See also 
Miss Universe

References 

 
Malaysia
Beauty pageants in Malaysia